Events from the year 1952 in Jordan.

Incumbents
Monarch: Talal (abdicated 11 August), Hussein (ascended 11 August)
Prime Minister: Tawfik Abu al-Huda

Events

 11 August - Crown Prince Hussein, was proclaimed King of the Hashemite Kingdom of Jordan.
 1952 Beit Jala Raid.

See also

 Years in Iraq
 Years in Syria
 Years in Saudi Arabia

References

 
1950s in Jordan
Jordan
Jordan
Years of the 20th century in Jordan